The Anti-Waste League was a political party in the United Kingdom, founded in 1921 by the newspaper proprietor Lord Rothermere.

Formation
The formation of the League was announced in a January 1921 edition of the Sunday Pictorial with Rothermere attacking what he saw as government waste during the Depression of 1920–1921. As such the party advocated reduced spending in government, at both local and national level. It was particularly critical of the retention of the high levels of income tax after the end of the war as well as the funding provided for the 'homes fit for heroes' scheme.

Electoral performance
The party stood in a number of by-elections, taking an increasingly anti-communist line. James Malcolm Monteith Erskine was elected as a joint nominee with an unofficial Conservative Association in the 1921 Westminster St George's by-election, and Murray Sueter was elected in a joint candidacy with the Independent Parliamentary Group in the 1921 Hertford by-election. Rothermere's son Esmond Harmsworth became the leader of the party's Westminster grouping, which co-operated closely with the Independent Parliamentary Group of Horatio Bottomley. Max Aitken, Lord Beaverbrook was also a leading patron of the group.

Dissolution
In reaction to the growth of the League, the Conservatives launched a Committee for National Expenditure, led by Eric Geddes, with the aim of cutting spending, and eventually acted on many of its recommendations. As their support dipped in the face of the Conservatives co-opting their ideas the League changed its focus to sponsoring independent candidates and even those from other parties who shared their aims. Following the 1922 general election the League disbanded with most of its members returning to the Conservative Party.

References

Defunct political parties in the United Kingdom
Political parties established in 1921
Political parties disestablished in 1922
1921 establishments in the United Kingdom
1922 disestablishments in the United Kingdom